Anctinopus bocaina is a species of mygalomorph spider in the family Actinopodidae. It can be found in Brazil.

The specific name bocaina refers to Bocaina, a municipality in the state of São Paulo, Brazil.

References 

bocaina